Going for the One is the eighth studio album by English progressive rock band Yes, released on 15 July 1977 by Atlantic Records. After taking a break in activity in 1975 for each member to release a solo album, and their 1976 tour of the United States and Canada, the band relocated to Montreux, Switzerland to record their next studio album. During rehearsals, keyboardist Patrick Moraz left the group, which marked the return of Rick Wakeman who had left to pursue a solo career after differences surrounding Tales from Topographic Oceans (1973). In a departure from their previous albums, Going for the One, with the exception of the fifteen-minute "Awaken", features shorter and more direct songs without an overarching concept, and saw Yes record with new engineering personnel and cover artists.

Going for the One received a mostly positive response from music critics who welcomed the band's return to more accessible music. It was a commercial success, reaching No. 1 on the UK Albums Chart for two weeks and No. 8 on the US Billboard 200. "Wonderous Stories" and "Going for the One" were released as singles; the former went to No. 7 in the UK and remains the band's highest-charting single in the country. It was certified gold by the Recording Industry Association of America (RIAA) within a month for selling 500,000 copies. Yes supported the album with a six-month tour of the US, Canada and Europe. A remastered edition was released in 2003 containing previously unreleased tracks from the album's recording sessions.

Background 

In August 1975, Yes wrapped their 1974–1975 tour of the US, Canada and the UK in support of their seventh studio album, Relayer (1974). The line-up during this time was lead vocalist Jon Anderson, bassist Chris Squire, guitarist Steve Howe, drummer Alan White, and keyboardist Patrick Moraz. For their next move, the group decided to take an extended break so each member could record and release a solo album. They regrouped for their Solo Albums Tour from May to August, which saw Yes perform some of their highest attended concerts. By October 1976, the band had become tax exiles and relocated to Montreux, Switzerland, to record a new studio album at Mountain Studios, their first studio album recorded overseas. They arrived at the studio when Emerson, Lake & Palmer were supposed to have finished Works (1977) but they were running overtime, leaving the group to work at a rehearsal space nearby for several weeks. A substantial amount of writing and arranging of their new material was done during this time.

In the first two months of writing and recording, Moraz was let go from the band, which he did not expect. Anderson thought he "just wasn't playing like he was involved", and that his sound was not "too good, and that affected his vibe ... it was obvious that he just wasn't getting off on what we were doing." Several months after his exit, Moraz said he had to leave because of "the enormous psychological pressures at the time within the group ... I felt there were a few things going on that I didn't know ... Unfortunately some people did not play the game fair, although the final decision was taken by all members." The decision was made after Rick Wakeman, who had left Yes in 1974 over differences surrounding their ambitious double album Tales from Topographic Oceans (1973) and whom Moraz replaced, was invited to play on Going for the One as a session musician by Yes manager Brian Lane and business partner Alex Scott. Wakeman had pursued a successful solo career, but by mid-1976 he faced money issues after his tour earlier in the year had met its minimal targets. He became interested in playing with Yes again after he had heard a tape of early versions of two of their new songs, "Going for the One" and "Wonderous Stories". Upon his arrival in Switzerland, Wakeman was surprised by how much the band had changed. "We began relating to each other for the first time. I think we had all grown up and became much more mature. Maybe I had to grow up more than them."

At a subsequent party held by Claude Nobs, Lane and Squire convinced Wakeman to become a full-time member as the group would have difficulty in finding a suitable replacement to play Wakeman's parts on their upcoming tour, but did not tell him that they had already informed the press of his return. Wakeman found out when he saw himself on the front cover of Melody Maker, which had printed the news on 4 December 1976.

Recording 

The album was recorded from October 1976 to April 1977. In a departure from their previous four studio albums, Yes recorded Going for the One with new engineering personnel. Since 1970, they had worked with Eddy Offord who also mixed their sound in concert. After the Relayer tour, Offord thought the band's style had become "a bit stale", and thought a split was needed to work with other bands. Yes employed recording engineer John Timperley who was assisted by David Richards. In a first for the band, the album was solely produced by themselves. It is also the first engineering job for Yes' future sound mixer Nigel Luby, who "did little more than watch and acquaint myself with the equipment." Squire recalled numerous heated arguments over the use of echo on the album, as the group were divided over its use.

The album marked a shift in the band's musical style. Having based Tales from Topographic Oceans and Relayer around extended or conceptual tracks, Yes decided to scale things back and record shorter and more accessible songs that critic and band biographer Chris Welch described as "user friendly". In one instance, Howe recalled the band had started to arrange a five-minute introduction to a song before they scrapped the idea, as the group realised "there are more ways of getting into songs [...] it was time to go back". Howe said that some songs originated from ideas "from other eras" of the band's history, specifically "Turn of the Century" and parts of "Awaken"; Squire said that others were almost completely improvised in the studio, such as the long keyboard section to "Awaken" and various closing keyboard and guitar solos on other songs. Anderson spoke about the group's direction at the time: "The album is a kind of celebration [...] Over the last two or three years we've been experimenting a lot and we're happy to have been given that chance. [...] We've come back to a happier medium. [...] If we wanted another 'Tales' concept we would have gone in that direction, but we needed to relax for a while—a little more laughing and jive."

In addition to recording at Mountain Studios, "Parallels" and "Awaken" features the church organ at St. Martin's in the town of Vevey, some four miles away from Montreux. The band considered using a mobile studio to record on location, but Timperley persuaded them to rent a telephone line due to their high fidelity and the ability to feed the line directly into the studio. "Parallels" was recorded with Wakeman in the church and the rest of the band in the studio; White counted the band in and they played the song through. On "Awaken", the organ is an overdub. Wakeman described the experience as "absolute magic". Wakeman changed his sound on the album with the use of a Polymoog, a polyphonic analogue synthesiser, which supplemented his traditional use of the Mellotron, Hammond organ, the RMI Electra Piano, and Minimoog synthesiser.

Songs

Side one 
"Going for the One" was originally written by Anderson around two or three years before the album was recorded. He had presented the song to the group at the time of writing, but the other members decided against recording it and the song was discarded. Squire rediscovered the song on a cassette which he brought into the studio one day, and it was chosen for further development. Howe plays a steel guitar for the entire song, an instrument he had introduced to the band on their previous album, Relayer; the introduction is what he had played during sound checks while on tour. Its meaning was inspired from various ideas, including sport, horse racing, a film he once saw about "going down the Grand Canyon river on one of those rubber dinghies", and "the cosmic mind". Some years later, he viewed the track as "a dynamic piece of music" that was an underrated and underplayed song in the band's repertoire.

"Turn of the Century" is credited to Anderson, Howe and White, the only track on the album that credits the latter as a writer. The song tells the story of Roan, a sculptor whose wife dies in the winter and, while in grief of her death, carves a statue of her and she is brought back to life. Anderson gained the idea from the opera La bohème, with additional inspiration from the Greek mythological figure Pygmalion, who falls in love with a statue of a woman that he carved. It was considerably shorter in length in its original form, but as the band continued to develop the song further Anderson suggested the song should tell the story musically before he added lyrics. White came up with the song's chord sequences on piano and also wrote the initial vocal melody, which Anderson took a liking to and wrote words for: the chords were later developed further in certain sections by Howe. White also wrote the section where the drums incorporate the tympani towards the end. The opening minutes of the track became one of Howe's favourite pieces of music by the band.

"Parallels" was part of a collection of songs that Squire had written for his solo album Fish Out of Water (1975), but were left out due to the limited capacity of a vinyl record. He also felt the song did not fit with the style of the other tracks on his album. When it came to selecting songs for Going for the One, Squire suggested the song for the group to record, which was received well by the other members. In its rough form, the song contained no guitar riffs. Its lyrics address the idea of hope, a recurring theme of Squire's lyrics.

Side two 
"Wonderous Stories" is the second track on the album solely written by Anderson. He wrote the song during "a beautiful day" while living in Switzerland, "one of those days you want to remember for years afterwards". During the day, the lyrics to the track entered his mind that he later wrote down. He noted the song's meaning as "the joys of life, as opposed to the uptightedness of some aspects of life" that was inspired by romantic stories and "a kind of dream sequence". White contributed the idea of the drums and bass playing on odd beats.

"Awaken" is a fifteen-minute track credited to Anderson and Howe. The music originated from an incident at a hotel when Anderson heard Howe repeatedly play a chord sequence on his guitar as he walked by, which led Anderson to sing some lyrical ideas on top of it on tape. Howe had written the beginning of the guitar solo previously, which was originally to be a part of a solo guitar piece. Anderson's main source of inspiration for the song was the book The Singer: A Classic Retelling of Cosmic Conflict (1975) by Calvin Miller, which he had read during his time in Switzerland. The book retells the story of Jesus in the form of an allegorical poem about a singer whose song could not be silenced. Anderson drew further inspiration from reading a biography on the Dutch painter Rembrandt, which had affected him "quite significantly". Moraz wrote an introduction for the song which was not used, but was adapted into "Time for a Change" on his solo album Out in the Sun (1977). Anderson wished to incorporate the harp into the song's middle section and "dream the audience, sort of Vivaldi", and later considered the song's lyrics and its final section with Wakeman's keyboards to be particularly strong. The track features choral passages performed by the Richard Williams Singers, whose musical arrangements were directed by Wakeman, and the Ars Laeta of Lausanne, recorded at the Église des Planches, a church in Montreux. An early version of the song's introduction was performed live during the band's final gig on the Relayer tour, in 1975.

Artwork 
In addition to a change of producers and engineers, Going for the One also marked a departure in the cover artists. Since 1971, they had worked with Roger Dean who became known for his surreal and fantastical landscapes and designed their distinct logo. While the band were recording Dean presented his idea for the cover painting, which had pieces of rock floating in the sky with the largest piece containing trees and a pool of water. The design was to be a conceptual sequel to his work produced on their first live album, Yessongs (1973). Dean said he flew to Montreux to discuss his ideas with the band but only met with Anderson, who was uninterested in his suggestions and instead, presented a rough design of what he wanted Dean to create. Anderson, however, claimed that while the band approached Dean to design the cover, he was unwilling to visit them. Howe claimed "a certain member" was no longer interested in working with Dean, which ended their collaboration until Drama (1980); in his 2021 memoir All My Yesterdays he attributes that to a "misunderstanding".

The band commissioned Storm Thorgerson and Aubrey Powell of Hipgnosis to design the artwork. They came up with a marked change in direction that represented a new, revitalised attitude within the band and their return to more direct and concise songs. Artist George Hardie contributed to the graphical design. Presented as a triple gatefold sleeve, the front cover depicts the back of a standing nude male looking at the Century Plaza Towers in Century City, California against a blue sky. By the time the album was released Yes had acquired full ownership of Dean's logo, which they previously had co-owned, and used it on the cover. Dean is credited in the liner notes. Inside features a photograph of each band member by Lake Geneva and Île de Peilz, an island on the lake that consists of a single tree. Richard Manning, a freelance artist who worked for Hipgnosis at the time, used double weighted photo paper to accommodate the triple gatefold. He applied various techniques onto the design including a light blue dye wash, clouds added with an airbrush, and photomontage. The coloured lines running through the cover were added at the printing stage. Anderson said the lines intersecting through the male define "points of the anatomy relative to our development."

Howe was not "thrilled" at the design at the time of release, but said it worked well with the music and was pleased that Dean's logo was retained; in 2021 he said he had "no hard feelings" about it. Melody Maker reporter and band biographer Chris Welch wrote about the cover: "Gone were the elaborate Roger Dean landscapes. In their place came stark, geometric simplicity. Anticipating computer designs of the future ... it symbolised a new look for Yes". Martin Popoff reviewed the design in 2016. "A new accelerated, late-'70s escapism through the clean lines of Hipgnosis, who combine slick, futuristic geometric urban angles with a man in his birthday suit, perhaps urgently propelling the band forward, while simultaneously embracing roots".

When released, the record label promoted the album with an outdoor advertising campaign. Howe recalled that one billboard with the album cover art on Sunset Boulevard in Los Angeles covered up the man's buttocks and thighs with a pair of trousers. He was bemused that anyone would have taken offence at the original image, particularly the "pimps, drug dealers and loose women" who frequented the street.

Release
Going for the One was released in the UK on 15 July 1977, available on LP, audio cassette, and 8-track tape. Its release was delayed after various problems were encountered with the pressing. It became a commercial success for the band, reaching number one on the UK Albums Chart, their second album to do so following Tales from Topographic Oceans, for two weeks in August 1977 and peaking at number 8 on the US Billboard 200. Elsewhere, the album went to number 7 in Norway. It was certified gold by the Recording Industry Association of America (RIAA) on 2 August 1977 for selling over 500,000 copies in the US. In the UK, the album reached silver certification by the British Phonographic Industry (BPI) on 19 September 1977, signifying 60,000 copies sold and sales worth over £150,000.

The album spawned two singles, both released in 1977. "Wonderous Stories" was released with "Parallels" as the B-side which peaked at number 7 in the UK singles chart. To help promote the song, Yes filmed their first music video for the song which received airplay on the BBC television music show Top of the Pops. It remains the band's highest-charting single in the country. The second, "Going for the One" with an edited version of "Awaken Pt. 1" on the B-side, reached number 24 in the UK.

Reception

In his review for Los Angeles Times, Steve Pond believed the album succeeds because the band had "lowered rather than raised its sights. By going back to basics rather than trying to top its previous 'extravaganzas', Yes has produced its most appealing collection" since Close to the Edge. He praised the "refreshing energy" the album brings, but noted their "kitchen-sink approach to song-writing, throwing everything into a composition but sometimes failing to smoothly integrate the disparate elements". In Record Mirror, reviewer Robin Smith gave the album five "+", the highest ranking which means "Unbeatable". He praised the title track, which opens the album with "an uncharacteristic piece of boogie" and has atmosphere and an effective ending. Smith concluded that with the album, "Yes dispel all your fears that the band are over the hill and finished [...] they're back stronger than ever." Billboard magazine gave a positive review, noting the band "is clearly going all out here to create its most ambitious and awesome work yet", and picked the title track, "Wonderous Stories", and "Awaken" as the best cuts.

In a retrospective review, biographer and reporter Chris Welch welcomed the album after the more complex material on Tales from Topographic Oceans and Relayer, citing its "melodic simplicity" which was "a breath of fresh air" and still stands up strong today. He praised Wakeman's performance and the band's choice in incorporating his talents into the music more effectively, which was not the case on Tales. He praised every track, calling "Wonderous Stories" a tune that allowed the group "to fly without really trying" and the closing moments of "Awaken", in particular, "quite beautiful ... the kind of music making now almost a lost art". Ross Boissoneau, for AllMusic, gave the album three stars out of five. He described Going for the One as "perhaps the most overlooked item in the Yes catalog ... In many ways, this disc could be seen as the follow-up to Fragile (1971). Its five tracks still retain mystical, abstract lyrical images, and the music is grand and melodic, the vocal harmonies perfectly balanced by the stinging guitar work of Steve Howe, Wakeman's keyboards, and the solid rhythms of Alan White and Chris Squire". He calls "Awaken" an "evocative track" with lyrics "spacey in the extreme", but praises Anderson and Squire's vocals and the addition of Anderson's harp and White's tuned percussion.

Tour

Yes supported Going for the One with a tour of the US, Canada and Europe that ran from 30 July to 6 December 1977, and featured Donovan as their opening act. The stage set had a much simpler design compared to the band's previous three tours, which centred around a series of illuminated shapes which gave a three-dimensional effect. Wakeman's keyboards were arranged on two levels. Anderson was illuminated in multiple colours as he sung an excerpt of "The Beautiful Land" from the musical The Roar of the Greasepaint – The Smell of the Crowd. The tour included a record six consecutive sold out nights at Wembley Arena in London that were attended by over 50,000 people. In order to play the different bass parts on "Awaken", Squire used a custom triple-necked bass made in 1975 by Wal for Roger Newell, the bassist in Wakeman's band the English Rock Ensemble. Recordings from the European tour were released on Yes's second live album, Yesshows (1981).

Yes selected Going for the One for their first Album Series Tour from March 2013 to June 2014, with the album performed live in its entirety and in track order.

Reissues
Going for the One was first reissued on CD across Europe in 1988. A digitally remastered CD followed in 1994 made by George Marino at Sterling Sound studios. In 2003, Rhino and Elektra Records released a new digitally remastered CD with seven bonus tracks. 2013 saw two remastered "audiophile" versions put out, one by Audio Fidelity for the Super Audio CD format and the other by Friday Music releasing a 180-gram LP using analog tape dubs since the original tapes were missing.

Track listing
All tracks arranged and produced by Jon Anderson, Steve Howe, Chris Squire, Alan White, and Rick Wakeman.

Notes

"Montreux's Theme" and "Amazing Grace" first appeared on Yesyears, released in 1991.
The version of "Vevey (Revisited)" featured here is different from the one released on Yesyears.

Personnel
Credits are adapted from the album's 1977 and 2003 liner notes.

Yes
Jon Anderson – lead vocals, harp
Steve Howe – steel guitar, acoustic and electric guitars, vachalia, pedal steel guitar, vocals
Chris Squire – bass guitar, fretless bass, 8-string bass, vocals
Rick Wakeman – piano, electric keyboards, church organ at St. Martin's in Vevey, Polymoog synthesizer, choral arrangement on "Awaken"
Alan White – drums, percussion, tuned percussion

Additional personnel
Ars Laeta of Lausanne – choir on "Awaken"
Richard Williams Singers – choir on "Awaken"

Production
Yes – production
John Timperley – recording engineer
David Richards – assistant recording engineer
Sean Davis – disc cutting
Paul Van Der Sonckheyd – disc cutting
George Hardie – graphics
Alex Grob – inner spread photography
Jaques Straessle – inner spread photography
Hipgnosis – sleeve design, photography
Roger Dean – Yes logo design
Brian Lane – executive producer

Chart performance

Weekly charts

Year-end charts

Certifications

References

Sources

Yes (band) albums
1977 albums
Atlantic Records albums
Albums produced by Jon Anderson
Albums produced by Steve Howe (musician)
Albums produced by Chris Squire
Albums produced by Rick Wakeman
Albums with cover art by Hipgnosis